Hans Per Rotmo (born 10 March 1948) is a Norwegian singer and songwriter, known by most Norwegians as the leading figure of 1970s folk-rock band Vømmøl Spellmannslag, and also known as the writer of hit songs like "Fire fine lænestola" and the Christmas tune "Vårres jul". Rotmo sings in his own dialect, from the municipality of Verdal.

He was a supporter of the revolutionary communist movement AKP(m-l) in his younger years, and many of the lyrics of his songs, especially those from the Vømmøl period, are influenced by the thoughts of Mao Zedong and Karl Marx, although the surface content of most of these songs concern the population of rural Norway, the industrial progress that followed World War II, and the effects of the latter on the former.

References 

Norwegian male singers
Norwegian songwriters
1948 births
Living people